Constricta  may refer to:
 Constricta (fungus), a fungus genus in the family Agaricaceae
 Constricta (snail), a land snail genus in the family Clausiliidae